Lyari River is a small ephemeral stream that flows through the Pakistani megacity of Karachi from north east to the center and drains into the Arabian Sea at the Manora channel. It is one of the two rivers of Karachi, the other one being Malir River. The river is about 50 kilometres (30 miles) long. As a seasonal river it carries the collected water after the rains in the catchment area.

History 

Until the 1970s, the river held clean water and fish, with farming activities on its banks. However, after the independence of Pakistan from British colonialism in 1947, when Karachi was announced as the capital city of the new country, a large influx of refugees from various Indian states as well as from other provinces of Pakistan came to live in the city. With rapid growth of the city's economy, industry, and population, the river's ecology was transformed and it gradually continued to discharge waste water, sewage and industrial effluents.

Redevelopments along the river 

With many squatter settlements groomed in the river's surroundings, the occasional floods started causing human and property loss. Especially, after the havoc caused by the torrential rains in 1977, need was realised to build flood barriers along the river. In 1986, a proposal was made to build an expressway through the city that would run along the riverbanks of Lyari. The plan was abandoned because an estimated 100,000 people would have to be relocated. However, the flood incidents continued in the 1990s.

Lyari Expressway 

The project comprises a 16.5 kilometre (10¼ mile) stretch of elevated expressway running along both sides of the river, cutting through the city to Karachi Port, as an extension/alternative to the Northern Bypass. The work commenced in 2002 without any public consensus, as a result of which large numbers of houses and schools were demolished on the reasons of Informal settlements. The measures were strongly opposed by affected population, community groups, civil society organizations and NGOs on the grounds that at least 200,000 families would have to be displaced from the development sites in addition to the economic and environmental costs. A number of cost effective alternatives were also proposed by local activists and organizations. However, the project continued with the additions of Lyari Expressway Resettlement Project as a relocation plan to move the affected families to the purpose-built areas in Hawk's Bay and Taiser Town, in the city's suburbs.

Other developments and extensions 
Apart from the eviction and resettlement of Lyari Expressway, redevelopment plans have also been carried out under the Lyari River Development Scheme in other towns along the river such as Gulberg, North Nazimabad, Saddar, Jamshed, Gulshan-e-Iqbal and Liaquatabad.

Pollution 

The river is the main contributor to an estimated amount of 200 million Imperial gallons (909.218 million litres) of raw sewage that enters the Arabian Sea. The only non-saline input is the local run-off from rainfall. A large number of industries including leather tanning units, pharmaceuticals, petrochemicals, refineries, chemical, textile, paper and pulp, engineering works and thermal power stations, located along the river, regularly  discharge their untreated industrial waste. With the growing amount of organic nutrients in the river water, the marine ecology along the coastal shelf has been alarmingly affected. The spillage due to tidal action also continues to affect the mangroves along the Karachi Port.  The pollutants along with other environmental perturbations have also proved to be harmful to the biodiversity of marine species along Karachi Fish Harbour including green turtle, seabirds and marine mammals.

See also
 Green turtle
 Lyari
 Lyari Town
 Lyari Development Authority
 Lyari Expressway Resettlement Project
 Lyari Expressway
 Malir River
 Gujjar Nala
 Karachi

References

External links
 IUCNP - IUCN's website on environmental issues and Biodiversity of Pakistan
 Pakistan Fisherfolk Forum on Marine pollution

Rivers of Karachi